Clarke Award or Clark Award may refer to:
Arthur C. Clarke Award, given yearly to a science fiction author for a novel published in the United Kingdom.
Sir Arthur Clarke Award, given yearly in the United Kingdom for achievements related to outer space.
 The John Bates Clark Medal for academic contributions by an American economist under age 40.